The Extraordinary and Plenipotentiary Ambassador of Peru to the United States of America is the official representative of the Republic of Peru to the United States of America. Both countries established relations on May 2, 1826 and have since maintained diplomatic relations.

The Ambassador is Peru's foremost diplomatic representative to the United States, and Chief of Mission in Washington, D.C. The Peruvian Embassy is located at Wilkins House, and the residence at Tompkins Mansion, both in Washington, D.C.

List of representatives

References 

 
United States
Peru